Shane Stringer is an American politician and former law enforcement officer serving as a member of the Alabama House of Representatives from the 102nd district. He assumed office on November 7, 2018.

Career 
Stringer was elected to the Alabama House of Representatives in 2018. He also served as the chief of police in Satsuma, Alabama. He later resigned from his position to serve as a captain in the Mobile County Sheriff's Office. In May 2021, Stringer was fired from his position in the sheriff's office for sponsoring constitutional carry legislation.

References 

Living people
Republican Party members of the Alabama House of Representatives
People from Mobile County, Alabama
Year of birth missing (living people)
21st-century American politicians